Esfandar Rural District is in Bahman District of Abarkuh County, Yazd province, Iran. At the National Census of 2006, its population was 3,824 in 1,086 households. There were 3,992 inhabitants in 1,211 households at the following census of 2011. At the most recent census of 2016, the population of the rural district was 4,044 in 1,301 households. The largest of its 133 villages was Esfandabad, with 1,449 people.

References 

Abarkuh County

Rural Districts of Yazd Province

Populated places in Yazd Province

Populated places in Abarkuh County